Simão Sessim (8 December 1935 – 16 August 2021) was a Brazilian politician.

Biography
He served as a member of the Chamber of Deputies from 1979 to 2019.

Sessim died from COVID-19 in August 2021, aged 85.

References

1935 births
2021 deaths
21st-century Brazilian politicians
20th-century Brazilian politicians
Brazilian jurists
Mayors of places in Brazil
Members of the Chamber of Deputies (Brazil) from Rio de Janeiro (state)
National Democratic Union (Brazil) politicians
National Renewal Alliance politicians
Democratic Social Party politicians
Democrats (Brazil) politicians
Reform Progressive Party politicians
Brazilian Social Democracy Party politicians
Progressistas politicians
Universidade Gama Filho alumni
People from Rio de Janeiro (city)
Deaths from the COVID-19 pandemic in Rio de Janeiro (state)